Steph is often a short form of the feminine given name Stephanie and its other variants, or the masculine given name Stephen.

Women
 Steph Catley (born 1994), Australian footballer
 Steph Cook (born 1972), Scottish retired pentathlete and 2000 Olympic champion
 Steph Davies (born 1987), Welsh international cricketer
 Steph Davis (born 1973), American rock climber, BASE jumper and wingsuit flyer
 Steph Geremia, Irish-American flute player and singer
 Steph Green, American film and television director
 Stephanie Hanna (born 1982), Canadian curler
 Steph Houghton (born 1988), English footballer
 Steph Key (born 1954), Australian politician
 Stephanie LeDrew (born 1984), Canadian curler
 Steph McGovern (born 1982), British journalist and television presenter
 Stephanie Rice (born 1988), Australian swimmer and three-time Olympic champion
 Steph Ryan (born 1986), Australian politician
 Steph Song (born 1984), Malaysian-born actress
 Steph Swainston (born 1974), British fantasy and science fiction author
 Stephanie Twell (born 1989), British middle- and long-distance runner

Men
 Steph Carse, stage name of Canadian pop singer Stéphane Dostie (born 1966)
 Steph Curry or Stephen Curry (born 1988), American basketball player
 Steph Reynolds (born 1993), Welsh rugby union player
 Steph Roberts (born 1985), South African rugby union footballer

Fictional characters
 Steph Cunningham, on the British soap opera Hollyoaks
 Stephanie Scully, on the Australian soap opera Neighbours
 Steph Stokes, on the British soap opera Emmerdale

See also
 Stephanie Pakrul (born 1982), internet personality known as "StephTheGeek"
 Steph., author code for German bryologist Franz Stephani (1842–1927)

Feminine given names
Lists of people by nickname
Hypocorisms